West is a 2007 Australian film written and directed by Daniel Krige and starring Khan Chittenden, Nathan Phillips, Gillian Alexy and Michael Dorman. The film had its world premiere at the 2007 Berlin International Film Festival and was scheduled for Australian release on 5 July 2007 at the Chauvel Cinema in Sydney and the Nova Cinema in Melbourne with other cities to follow.

Johnette Napolitano of Concrete Blonde fame is the main vocalist on the score to West. She also sings the title song, "Falling in Love".

Premise

Pete and Jerry are cousins living in Sydney's western suburbs, where they both fall in love with the same girl.

Cast

Reception
Matt Ravier of In Film Australia gave the film a negative review, noting "[t]he wrong-side-of-the-tracks film is an indie staple stateside. This Australian variant doesn’t succeed in updating the well-worn genre and seems happy to simply recycle the classic coming-of-age elements of more successful productions." Margaret Pomeranz of ABC's At the Movies provided a more favourable reception concluding that it "may not be an easy film for audiences but for me it was a tremendously moving and rewarding experience."

Box office
West grossed $57,472 at the box office in Australia.

See also
Cinema of Australia

References

External links

 West on MySpace

2007 films
Australian coming-of-age drama films
2000s coming-of-age drama films
2007 drama films
2000s English-language films
2000s Australian films